Novoukrainka is a city in Kirovohrad Oblast (province) of Ukraine. It serves as the administrative center of Novoukrainka Raion. It hosts the administration of Novoukrainka urban hromada, one of the hromadas of Ukraine. Population:

History 
Former settlement in Kherson Governorate of the Russian Empire.

A local newspaper is published here since March 1930.

City since 1938.

During World War II, the city was occupied by German troops from August 5, 1941 to March 17, 1944.

In 1989 population was 20 675 people.

References

Cities in Kirovohrad Oblast
Cities of district significance in Ukraine
Yelisavetgradsky Uyezd